Piliscus commodus is a species of small sea snail with a transparent internal shell, a marine gastropod mollusk in the family Velutinidae. Because the shell is mostly internal, the snail resembles a sea slug in general appearance.

Distribution

Description 
The maximum recorded (shell?) length is 28 mm.

Habitat 
The minimum recorded depth for this species is 40 m; maximum recorded depth is 325 m.

References

Velutinidae
Gastropods described in 1851
Taxa named by Alexander von Middendorff